Sea Fever is a 1931 British play by Auriol Lee and John Van Druten. It is based on the 1929 play Marius by Marcel Pagnol about a Marius, a young man in Marseilles whose desire to go to sea overcomes his developing romance with a local girl.

It was staged at the New Theatre in the West End but was not successful, lasting for only six performances. The Sunday Times described it as being all atmosphere and no plot. The cast included Maurice Evans, Peggy Ashcroft, Norman McKinnel and Mary Clare.

References

Bibliography
 Wearing, J.P. The London Stage 1930-1939: A Calendar of Productions, Performers, and Personnel.  Rowman & Littlefield, 2014.

1931 plays
Plays by John Van Druten
Plays set in France
West End plays
Adaptations of works by Marcel Pagnol